

Calendar

Preliminary round

Group A 

Note: All times are local

Group B 

Note: All times are local

Medal Round 

Source: Paralympic.org  

Quarterfinals

Semifinals

Bronze medal game

Gold medal game

Classification 5-8 

Source: Paralympic.org  

Classification

Seventh place

Fifth place

Classification 9-10 

Source: Paralympic.org

Ranking

References 

 

Women
International women's basketball competitions hosted by China
2008 in women's basketball